The structure of a thing is how the parts of it relate to each other, how it is "assembled".

Structure may also refer to:

Architecture 
 Architectural structure, a man-made structure used or intended for supporting or sheltering any use or continuous occupancy
 Building
 Nonbuilding structure
 Building (disambiguation)

Engineering 
 Structural engineering
 Structural analysis, the study of the strength and properties of structures

Biology 
 Canopy (biology) structure, organization or three-dimensional geometry of a plant canopy
 Community (ecology) structure, ecological organization of a biological community
 Structure (journal), a scientific journal describing protein structures
 Structure, a journal on form and function in modern biology

Chemistry 
 Chemical structure, the spatial arrangement of atoms and bonds in a molecule
 Protein structure
 The spatial arrangement of ions, atoms, or molecules in condensed matter
 Crystal structure
 Structure of liquids and glasses

Mathematics 
 Mathematical structure on a set, additional mathematical objects that in some manner attach to the set, making it easier to visualize or work with, or endowing the collection with meaning or significance
 Algebraic structure, the systems that are studied in universal algebra 
 Structure (mathematical logic), the algebraic structures studied in model theory
 Structure constants, defining a Lie algebra or an algebra over a field
 Structuralism (philosophy of mathematics), a theory in the philosophy of mathematics that holds that mathematical theories describe structures of mathematical objects

Social sciences and linguistics 
 Structuralism,  the theory that elements of human culture must be understood in terms of their relationship to a larger, overarching system or structure
 Structural linguistics, an approach to linguistics originating from the work of Ferdinand de Saussure, a part of the overall approach of structuralism
 Deep structure and surface structure, concepts in linguistics, specifically the study of syntax in the Chomskyan tradition
 Social structure, a pattern of social arrangements in society
 Structural functionalism, a theory of society as a system whose parts work together to promote solidarity and stability
 Functional structuralism, a theory of society that deduces structure from function
 Structural anthropology, a theory of social structure in primitive societies, strongly associated with the work of Claude Lévi Strauss
 Biogenetic structuralism, a theory of anthropology grounded in neuroscience
 Structuration theory, a theory of social systems based in the analysis of both structure and agents
 Structure and agency, two confronted theories about human behaviour
 Base and superstructure, two parts of a Marxist analysis of society
 Structural Marxism, an approach to Marxism based on structuralism, associated with Louis Althusser
 Structuralism (architecture), a structuralist critique of architecture
 Structuralist film theory, a branch of film theory rooted in structuralism
 Post-structuralism, the theory that structuralism evolved into

Literature 
 Dramatic structure, the way dramatic works, such as plays or films, are organized
 Narrative structure, the order and manner in which a narrative is presented to a reader, listener, or viewer

Finance 
 Financial structure, the area of finance dealing with monetary decisions that business enterprises make and the tools and analysis used to make these decisions
 Capital structure, the way a corporation finances its assets through a combination of equity, debt, or hybrid securities
 Structured finance, a sector of finance created to help provide increased liquidity or funding sources to markets

Music 
 Musical structure (disambiguation)
 Structure (Terri Lyne Carrington album), 2004
 Structures (John Abercrombie album), 2006
 Structures (Boulez), composition
 Structures (John Digweed album), 2010
 Structures (band), a Canadian metalcore band

Other uses 
 Structural art, examples of structural engineering that attain excellence in the three areas of efficiency, economy, and elegance
 Large-scale structure of the cosmos
 Structural geology, the three dimensional distribution of rock bodies and their planar or folded surfaces, and their internal fabrics
 Data structure, a way of storing data in a computer so that it can be used efficiently
 The Structure of Scientific Revolutions, a 1962 book by Thomas Kuhn on the history of science
 Structure, the former name for the Express Men clothing brand

See also 
 Struct
 Order (disambiguation)